Delaney Jane (born April 17, 1993) is a Canadian singer and songwriter. She rose to prominence as a guest vocalist on numerous popular dance tracks including the Juno-nominated "Limitless" before starting her own independent label imprint Dirty Pretty Things. Her official debut solo single, "Bad Habits", was released in 2018 to commercial success. Jane released her debut studio album, Dirty Pretty Things, in 2019.

Career
Jane studied performing arts in Toronto, Ontario and met friend and fellow musician Shaun Frank. After touring with Frank, Jane performed the vocals on his 2014 single, "This Could Be Love". She would later collaborate with Frank on other dance tracks including "Shades of Grey" - her first single to chart in the United States on the Dance/Mix Show Airplay chart - and "La La Land" - her first single to enter the Canadian Hot 100 and be certified Gold by Music Canada. Her Adventure Club collaboration, "Limitless", was nominated for Dance Recording of the Year at the 2017 Juno Awards, but ultimately lost to Off the Ground by Bit Funk.

While working on music for her formal debut as a solo artist, Jane collaborated with Canadian DJ Grandtheft on "Easy Go", which impacted multiple charts in Canada and the United States. She released two independent singles - "Howl" and "Hotel Room" - in 2017 and 2018, respectively, but her second single of 2018, "Bad Habits", has been described as her first solo single. The latter song became her highest-charting single to date on the Canadian Hot 100, first top-ten on a Canadian airplay chart, and first single to be certified Platinum by Music Canada. After a series of other singles, Jane released her debut studio album, Dirty Pretty Things, on November 22, 2019.

Jane released an extended play titled Somewhere Else on December 10, 2020. The collection's fifth single, "Just as Much", was released in 2021 and attained Jane's highest chart positions since "Bad Habits". Also in 2020, Jane was a featured vocalist on the track "Every Time You Leave" from American rock band I Prevail's second studio album, Trauma (2020), which was subsequently released as the album's fifth single and earned Jane her first entry on the Billboard rock charts.

Discography

Studio albums

Extended plays

Singles

As lead artist

As featured artist

Other appearances

Music videos

Awards and nominations

Juno Awards

!
|-
| rowspan="1"| 2017
| "Limitless" 
| Dance Recording of the Year
| 
| 
|}

iHeartRadio Much Music Video Awards

!
|-
| rowspan="1"| 2017
| "Easy Go" 
| Best EDM/Dance Video
| 
| 
|}

Notes

References

1993 births
Living people
Musicians from Toronto
21st-century Canadian women singers